Duḥkha (Sanskrit: दुःख; Pāli: dukkha), commonly translated as "suffering", "pain," or "unhappiness," is an important concept in Buddhism, Jainism and Hinduism. Its meaning depends on the context, and may refer more specifically to the "unsatisfactoriness" or "unease" of mundane life when driven by craving/ grasping and ignorance. 

While the term dukkha has often been derived from the prefix du ("bad" or "difficult") and the root kha, "empty," "hole," a badly fitting axle-hole of a cart or chariot giving "a very bumpy ride," it may actually be derived from duḥ-stha, a "dis-/ bad- + stand-," that is, "standing badly , unsteady," "unstable."

It is the first of the Four Noble Truths and it is one of the three marks of existence. The term also appears in scriptures of Hinduism, such as the Upanishads, in discussions of moksha (spiritual liberation).

Etymology and meaning
Duḥkha (Sanskrit: दुःख; Pali: dukkha) is a term found in the Upanishads and Buddhist texts, meaning anything that is "uneasy, uncomfortable, unpleasant, difficult, causing pain or sadness". It is also a concept in Indian religions about the nature of life that innately includes the "unpleasant", "suffering", "pain", "sorrow", "distress", "grief" or "misery." The term duḥkha does not have a one-word English translation, and embodies diverse aspects of unpleasant human experiences. It is often understood as the opposite of sukha, meaning "happiness," "comfort" or "ease."

Etymology

Axle hole
The word has been explained in recent times as a derivation from Aryan terminology for an axle hole, referring to an axle hole which is not in the center and leads to a bumpy, uncomfortable ride. According to Winthrop Sargeant,

Joseph Goldstein, American vipassana teacher and writer, explains the etymology as follows:

'Standing unstable'
However, according to Monier Monier-Williams, the actual roots of the Pali term dukkha appear to be Sanskrit दुस्- (dus-, "bad") + स्था (stha, "to stand").{{refn|group=note|: "according to grammarians properly written dush-kha and said to be from dus and kha [cf. su-khá]; but more probably a Prākritized form for duḥ-stha, q.v."}} Regular phonological changes in the development of Sanskrit into the various Prakrits led to a shift from dus-sthā to duḥkha to dukkha.

Analayo concurs, stating that dukkha as derived from duh-stha, "standing badly," "conveys nuances of "uneasiness" or of being "uncomfortable." Silk Road philologist Christopher I. Beckwith elaborates on this derivation. According to Beckwith:

Translation
The literal meaning of duhkha, as used in a general sense is "suffering" or "painful." Its exact translation depends on the context. Contemporary translators of Buddhist texts use a variety of English words to convey the aspects of dukh. Early Western translators of Buddhist texts (before the 1970s) typically translated the Pali term dukkha as "suffering." Later translators have emphasized that "suffering" is a too limited translation for the term duḥkha, and have preferred to either leave the term untranslated, or to clarify that translation with terms such as anxiety, distress, frustration, unease, unsatisfactoriness, not having what one wants, having what one doesn't want, etc. In the sequence "birth is painfull," dukhka may be translated as "painfull."  When related to vedana, "feeling," dukkha ("unpleasant," "painfull") is the opposite of sukkha ("pleasure," "pleasant"), yet all feelings are dukkha in that they are impermanent, conditioned phenomena, which are unsatisfactory, incapable of providing lasting satisfaction. The term "unsatisfactoriness" then is often used to emphasize the unsatisfactoriness of "life under the influence of afflictions and polluted karma."

BuddhismDuḥkha is one of the three marks of existence, namely anitya ("impermanent"), duḥkha ("unsatisfactory"), anatman (without a lasting essence).

Within the Buddhist sutras, duḥkha has a broad meaning, and is divided in three categories:
 Dukkha-dukkha, aversion to physical suffering - this includes the physical and mental sufferings of birth, aging, illness, dying; distress due to what is not desirable.
 Viparinama-dukkha, the frustration of disappearing happiness - this is the duḥkha of pleasant or happy experiences changing to unpleasant when the causes and conditions that produced the pleasant experiences cease.
 Sankhara-dukkha, the unsatisfactoriness of changing and impermanent "things" - the incapability of conditioned things to give us lasting happiness. This includes "a basic unsatisfactoriness pervading all existence, all forms of life, because all forms of life are changing, impermanent and without any inner core or substance." On this level, the term indicates a lack of lasting satisfaction, or a sense that things never measure up to our expectations or standards.

Various sutras sum up how life in this "mundane world" is regarded to be duḥkha, starting with samsara, the ongoing process of death and rebirth itself:
 Birth is duḥkha, aging is duḥkha, illness is duḥkha, death is duḥkha; 
 Sorrow, lamentation, pain, grief, and despair are duḥkha; 
 Association with the unbeloved is duḥkha; separation from the loved is duḥkha; 
 Not getting what is wanted is duḥkha. 
 In conclusion, the five clinging-aggregates are duḥkha.

The Buddhist tradition emphasizes the importance of developing insight into the nature of duḥkha, the conditions that cause it, and how it can be overcome. This process is formulated in the teachings on the Four Noble Truths.

Hinduism
In these scriptures of Hinduism, the Sanskrit word dukha (दुःख) appears in the sense of "suffering, sorrow, distress", and in the context of a spiritual pursuit and liberation through the knowledge of Atman (soul/self).

The verse 4.4.14 of the  states:

The verse 7.26.2 of the  states:

The concept of sorrow and suffering, and self-knowledge as a means to overcome it, appears extensively with other terms in the pre-Buddhist Upanishads. The term Duhkha also appears in many other middle and later post-Buddhist Upanishads such as the verse 6.20 of Shvetashvatara Upanishad, as well as in the Bhagavada Gita, all in the context of moksha. The term also appears in the foundational Sutras of the six schools of Hindu philosophy, such as the opening lines of Samkhya karika of the Samkhya school.Samkhya karika by Iswara Krishna, Henry Colebrooke (Translator), Oxford University Press

Comparison of Buddhism and Hinduism
Both Hinduism and Buddhism emphasize that one overcomes dukha through the development of understanding and insight. However, the two religions widely differ in the nature of that understanding. Hinduism emphasizes the understanding and acceptance of Atman ("self", "soul") and Brahman ("the ultimate reality of the universe"). The connection is the distress and suffering caused by an individual situation that can counter a person's wishes and perception. Duhkha, in particular, refers to the sense of disappointing feelings that come from the gulf between perception and desires and true experience. In Hindi, duhkha generally means "difficult to do" or "to have hardship in doing" as it is inflexible. By contrast, Buddhism emphasizes the understanding and acceptance of anatta (anatman, "non-self", "non-soul"), the means to liberation from duḥkha. The root meaning of duhkha is used in various ways in different schools of Indian thought and Buddhism.

See also
 Existential despair
 Four Noble Truths
 Nirodha
 Noble Eightfold Path
 Pathos
 Samudaya
 The Sickness Unto Death''
 Suffering  
 Sukha
 Taṇhā

Notes

References

Sources

Printed sources

 
 
 

 
 

 

 
 

 
 
 
 

 
 

 

 

 
 

 

 
 

 
 

 
 

Web-sources

External links
 Everything Is Teaching Us, Ajahn Chah (2018), Amaravati Publications 
 How does mindfulness transform suffering? I: the nature and origins of dukkha, JD Teasdale, M Chaskalson (2011)
 Explanations of dukkha, Tilmann Vetter (1998), Journal of the International Association of Buddhist Studies
 What Buddha Taught, Walpola Rahula
 Dukkha, edited by John T. Bullitt - Access to Insight
 The Buddha's Concept of Dukkha, Kingsley Heendeniya
 Ku 苦 entry (use "guest" with no password for one-time login), Digital Dictionary of Buddhism

Hindu philosophical concepts
Buddhist philosophical concepts
Suffering
Sanskrit words and phrases